Hill equation may refer to
 Hill equation (biochemistry)
 Hill differential equation